Caustic humour is a type of humour which relies on witty insults. As is implied by the name (which literally means humour which is designed to burn or to corrode), it involves the clever use of language to convey biting, insulting, or sometimes even cruel remarks.

This kind of humour is often attributed to such comedians and comedic writers as Lenny Bruce, David Foster Wallace, Richard Pryor, Don Rickles, George Carlin, Bill Hicks, Fran Lebowitz, Bea Arthur, Andrew Dice Clay, Ben "Yahtzee" Croshaw, Ricky Gervais, and Bill Murray, philosophers  Voltaire and Ludwig Wittgenstein and politicians Sir Michael Cullen, Paul Keating, Derryn Hinch, and Dennis Skinner. It is a feature of the work of children’s author Roald Dahl.

Examples

References

Humour